The 1905 Western Conference football season was the tenth season of college football played by the member schools of the Western Conference (later known as the Big Ten Conference) and was a part of the 1905 college football season.

The 1905 Chicago Maroons football team won the conference championship, compiled an 11–0 record, and outscored opponents 271 to 5. The Maroons were retroactively named national champions by the Billingsley Report, the Helms Athletic Foundation, the National Championship Foundation, and the Houlgate System.

Michigan won the first 12 games of the season by a combined score of 495 to 0, but lost the final game of the season by a score of 2–0 against Chicago.

Minnesota compiled a 10-1 record, shut out 10 of 12 opponents, and outscored all opponents 542 to 22.

Season overview

Results and team statistics

Key

PPG = Average of points scored per game
PAG = Average of points allowed per game

Regular season

Bowl games
No Western Conference schools participated in any bowl games during the 1905 season.

Awards and honors

All-Americans

The following Western Conference players were selected as first-team players on the 1905 College Football All-America Team. (Consensus All-Americans displayed in bold).

 Mark Catlin, end, Chicago (Caspar Whitney [CW])
 Walter Eckersall, quarterback, Chicago (Walter Camp [WC], CW, New York Evening Post [NYEP])
 Thomas S. Hammond, Michigan (NYEP)

All-Western players

Eleven players were chosen as first-team players on at least five of the 1905 All-Western college football teams named by the following 10 selectors: Chicago American (CA), Chicago Chronicle (CC), Chicago Daily News (CDN), Chicago Evening Journal (CEJ), Chicago Evening Post (CP), Chicago Record-Herald (CRH), Chicago Tribune (CT), E. C. Patterson for Collier's Weekly (ECP), J. H. Ritchie in Illustrated Outdoor News (JHR), and The Minneapolis Journal (MJ). (Players unanimously chosen by all 10 selectors are listed in bold.)

References